Narayan Patel is an Indian politician from Bhartiya Janata Party. He was elected as MLA of Mandhata in Madhya Pradesh in 2018 as candidate of Indian National Congress. He resigned as MLA from Madhya Pradesh assembly and joined Bhartiya Janata Party on 23-Jul-2020.

References

Living people
Indian National Congress politicians
Year of birth missing (living people)
Bharatiya Janata Party politicians from Madhya Pradesh
Madhya Pradesh MLAs 2018–2023